Anna Nathalie Hoff Persson (born 18 April 1997) is a Swedish football midfielder who most recently played for Sporting CP. She joined the Portuguese club in September 2018, but departed in December. Who plays for KIF Örebro.

Honours

Club 
Rosengård
Winner
 Damallsvenskan (3): 2013, 2014, 2015
 Svenska Supercupen: 2015

Runner-up
 Svenska Cupen: 2014–15

International 
Sweden U19
Winner
 UEFA Women's Under-19 Championship: 2015

References

External links 
 
 
 
 

1997 births
Living people
Swedish women's footballers
FC Rosengård players
BK Häcken FF players
Damallsvenskan players
Women's association football midfielders
Expatriate women's footballers in Portugal
Swedish expatriate women's footballers
Swedish expatriate sportspeople in Portugal
Campeonato Nacional de Futebol Feminino players
Sporting CP (women's football) players
IF Limhamn Bunkeflo players